Pleasant Run is an unincorporated community in Tucker County, West Virginia, United States.

References 

Unincorporated communities in West Virginia
Unincorporated communities in Tucker County, West Virginia